Lubishtë is a village in the municipality of Vitia, Kosovo.

Geography 
The village is located in the Karadak Mountain range and borders the Anamorava valley to the North.

History 
The ancestors of the inhabitants of the village belong to the Sopi tribe.

Notes and references 
Notes:

References:

Villages in Viti, Kosovo